Richard Peter Tudor Sillett (1 February 1933 – 13 March 1998) was an English footballer. He played for Chelsea and Southampton as a right-back, and made three appearances for England. He was the older brother of John Sillett, who managed Coventry City to FA Cup success in 1987. Sir Stanley Matthews once said that Sillett was the best full-back he ever played against.

Southampton
Peter was the son of Charlie Sillett (who was a full-back with Southampton from 1931 to 1938) and inherited his father's skills. He joined the Saints in January 1949 and soon afterwards gained England Youth recognition.

Extremely well-built, weighing over 13 stone when only 18, Sillett matured quickly into a full-back of some distinction.

Southampton were facing mounting debts and, with this fact known to many of the country's top clubs, Sillett, together with his younger brother John, was "induced" to join Ted Drake's Chelsea, for a fee of £12,000.

In his two seasons at The Dell, he made 65 appearances in all competitions and scored four goals.

England
Sillett was also an England international, winning three caps in 1955, and was in England's squad for the 1958 FIFA World Cup.

Later career
He moved to Guildford City and then on to Ashford Town as player-manager. He managed both Ashford Town and Hastings United twice each and oversaw promotion during each spell.

Honours
Chelsea
First Division championship: 1954–55
FA Charity Shield: 1955

References

 Player by Player – Peter Lovering – Guinness Publishing 1993 
 Stamford Bridge Legends – David Lane – Legends Publishing 2003

External links
England career profile
 Chelsea profile

1933 births
1998 deaths
England international footballers
England B international footballers
England under-23 international footballers
English footballers
1958 FIFA World Cup players
Association football fullbacks
Footballers from Southampton
Southampton F.C. players
Chelsea F.C. players
Guildford City F.C. players
Ashford United F.C. players
Ashford United F.C. managers
Hastings United F.C. (1948) managers
Hastings United F.C. managers
English Football League players
London XI players
English Football League representative players
English football managers